Mt. Sinai Baptist Church is a historic Baptist church located at 512 Henry Street in Eden, Rockingham County, North Carolina.  It was built in 1921, and is a two-story, Late Gothic Revival style brick church. It sits on a raised basement and it has tall gable front flanked by square two-stage crenellated bell towers incorporated at each corner.  It features pointed arch tower windows and brightly colored stained glass.  It is the oldest African-American Baptist Church in Eden.

It was added to the National Register of Historic Places in 1987.

References

African-American history of North Carolina
Baptist churches in North Carolina
Churches on the National Register of Historic Places in North Carolina
Gothic Revival church buildings in North Carolina
Churches completed in 1921
20th-century Baptist churches in the United States
Churches in Rockingham County, North Carolina
National Register of Historic Places in Rockingham County, North Carolina
1921 establishments in North Carolina